David Overton (born 18 August 1943) is a Canadian rower. He competed in the men's eight event at the 1964 Summer Olympics.

References

1943 births
Living people
Canadian male rowers
Olympic rowers of Canada
Rowers at the 1964 Summer Olympics
Place of birth missing (living people)
Pan American Games medalists in rowing
Pan American Games gold medalists for Canada
Rowers at the 1963 Pan American Games